Padejsuk Pitsanurachan; is a Thai Muay Thai fighter who competed at the highest level of Muay Thai in late 1970s. He was the 1979 King's Muay Thai Fighter of the Year.

Biography and career
Khamsej started Muay Thai at the age of 14, fighting under the name Seisuk Kwanjaithungmon. He had about 40 fights in various provinces accumulating wins agasint future champion such as Lom-Isan Sor.Thanikul, Nanfah Seeharajdesho and Nokweed Davy. In 1974 he moved to Bangkokg and joined the Pitsanurachan camp.

Padejsuk was one of the best fighters of the late 1970s with wins against Samersing Tianhirun, Nongkhai Sor.Prapatsorn, Sagat Petchyindee, Vicharnnoi Porntawee, Narongnoi Kiatbandit, Dieselnoi Chor Thanasukarn, Posai Sitiboonlert and Jitti Muangkhonkaen.

In 1979 he was elected fighter of the Year, he received the award from the hands of King Rama IX. Padejsuk was a complete fighter feared for his sharp elbows and heavy hands he perfected during a short stint in amateur boxing. At the peak of his career he received purses as high as 1200,000 baht.

After retirement Padejsuk opened a shop and became a Muay Thai trainer in various camps. He was an instructor at the Bangkok Thonburi University and has been teaching at a police academy in the city of Salaya since 2015.

Titles and accomplishments

Muay Thai
 1979 Sports Writers Association of Thailand Fighter of the Year
 1980 Sports Writers Association of Thailand Fight of the Year (vs. Nongkhai Sor.Prapatsorn)

Boxing
 Rajadamnern Stadium 135 lbs Champion

Fight record

Boxing record

Muay Thai record

|-  style="background:#fbb;"
| 1983-09-21 || Loss ||align=left| Inseenoi Sor.Thanikul|| Rajadamnern Stadium || Bangkok, Thailand || Decision || 5 || 3:00

|-  style="background:#fbb;"
| 1983- || Loss ||align=left| Inseenoi Sor.Thanikul|| Rajadamnern Stadium  || Bangkok, Thailand || Decision || 5 || 3:00
|-
! style=background:white colspan=9 |

|-  style="background:#fbb;"
| 1983-01-20 || Loss ||align=left| Samart Prasarnmit|| Rajadamnern Stadium  || Bangkok, Thailand || Decision || 5 || 3:00

|-  style="background:#fbb;"
| 1982-12-24 || Loss ||align=left| Jock Kiatniwat || Rajadamnern Stadium || Bangkok, Thailand || Decision || 5 || 3:00

|-  style="background:#cfc;"
| 1982-08-03 || Win||align=left| Sagat Petchyindee ||  || Bangkok, Thailand || Decision || 5 ||3:00

|-  style="background:#cfc;"
| 1982-06-10 || Win ||align=left| Sagat Petchyindee || Rajadamnern Stadium || Bangkok, Thailand || Decision ||5 ||3:00

|-  style="background:#fbb;"
| 1982-05-10|| Loss ||align=left| Samart Payakaroon || Rajadamnern Stadium || Bangkok, Thailand || Decision || 5 || 3:00

|-  style="background:#fbb;"
| 1982-03-12|| Loss ||align=left| Samart Payakaroon || Lumpinee Stadium || Bangkok, Thailand || Decision || 5 || 3:00

|-  style="background:#fbb;"
| 1982-01-25 || Loss||align=left| Dieselnoi Chor Thanasukarn ||  || Bangkok, Thailand || Decision || 5 || 3:00

|-  style="background:#cfc;"
| 1981-12-03 || Win||align=left| Nongkhai Sor.Prapatsorn || Rajadamnern Stadium || Bangkok, Thailand || Decision || 5 ||3:00

|-  style="background:#cfc;"
| 1981-11-09 || Win ||align=left| Kengkla Sitsei || Rajadamnern Stadium || Bangkok, Thailand || Decision || 5 ||3:00

|-  style="background:#cfc;"
| 1981-10-05 || Win ||align=left| Saengsakda Kittkasem || Rajadamnern Stadium || Bangkok, Thailand || Decision || 5 || 3:00

|-  style="background:#cfc;"
| 1981-08-24 || Win ||align=left| Kengkla Sitsei || Rajadamnern Stadium || Bangkok, Thailand || Decision || 5 ||3:00

|-  style="background:#cfc;"
| 1981-06-14 || Win ||align=left| Sisa Rikhaen || Rajadamnern Stadium || Bangkok, Thailand || Decision || 5 ||3:00

|-  style="background:#fbb;"
| 1981-05-14 || Loss||align=left| Kaopong Sitichuchai || Rajadamnern Stadium || Bangkok, Thailand || Decision || 5 || 3:00

|-  style="background:#cfc;"
| 1981-03-26 || Win ||align=left| Nongkhai Sor.Prapatsorn || Rajadamnern Stadium || Bangkok, Thailand || Decision || 5 ||3:00

|-  style="background:#cfc;"
| 1981-01-26 || Win ||align=left| Jitti Muangkhonkaen || Rajadamnern Stadium || Bangkok, Thailand || Decision || 5 ||3:00

|-  style="background:#fbb;"
| 1980-12-18 || Loss ||align=left| Nongkhai Sor.Prapatsorn || Rajadamnern Stadium || Bangkok, Thailand || Decision || 5 ||3:00

|-  style="background:#cfc;"
| 1980-11-13 || Win ||align=left| Kengkaj Kiatkriangkrai || Rajadamnern Stadium || Bangkok, Thailand || Decision || 5 ||3:00

|-  style="background:#fbb;"
| 1980-08-08 || Loss ||align=left| Kaopong Sitichuchai || Lumpinee Stadium || Bangkok, Thailand || Decision || 5 || 3:00

|-  style="background:#cfc;"
| 1980-07-03 || Win ||align=left| Raktae Muangsurin || Rajadamnern Stadium || Bangkok, Thailand || Decision|| 5 || 3:00

|-  style="background:#cfc;"
| 1980-05-26 || Win ||align=left| Paul Ferreri||  Rajadamnern Stadium || Bangkok, Thailand || KO (Right high kick)|| 4 || 
|-
! style=background:white colspan=9 |

|-  style="background:#fbb;"
| 1980-04-28 || Loss||align=left| Dieselnoi Chor Thanasukarn || Rajadamnern Stadium || Bangkok, Thailand || Decision|| 5 || 3:00

|-  style="background:#cfc;"
| 1980-04-10 || Win ||align=left| Yasunori ||  Rajadamnern Stadium || Bangkok, Thailand || KO || 1 || 

|-  style="background:#cfc;"
| 1980-03-05 || Win||align=left| Vicharnnoi Porntawee|| Rajadamnern Stadium || Bangkok, Thailand || Decision || 5 || 3:00

|-  style="background:#cfc;"
| 1980-01-22 || Win||align=left| Narongnoi Kiatbandit|| Lumpinee Stadium || Bangkok, Thailand || Decision || 5 || 3:00
|-
! style=background:white colspan=9 |

|-  style="background:#cfc;"
| 1979-12-07 || Win||align=left| Posai Sitiboonlert|| Lumpinee Stadium || Bangkok, Thailand || TKO (Punches) || 4 || 

|-  style="background:#cfc;"
| 1979-11-12 || Win ||align=left| Sakayuri ||  || Bangkok, Thailand || TKO  || 4 || 

|-  style="background:#cfc;"
| 1979-10-12 || Win ||align=left| Kamlayok Kiatsompop || Lumpinee Stadium || Bangkok, Thailand || Decision || 5 || 3:00

|-  style="background:#cfc;"
| 1979-09-07 || Win ||align=left| Khaosod Sitpraprom || Lumpinee Stadium|| Bangkok, Thailand || Decision || 5 || 3:00

|-  style="background:#cfc;"
| 1979-07-30 || Win ||align=left| Satoru Matsumoto || Rajadamnern Stadium || Bangkok, Thailand || TKO (Corner Stoppage) || 2 || 

|-  style="background:#fbb;"
| 1979-07-02 || Loss||align=left| Vicharnnoi Porntawee|| Rajadamnern Stadium || Bangkok, Thailand || Decision || 5 || 3:00

|-  style="background:#cfc;"
| 1979-06-11 || Win ||align=left| Pannoi Sakornpitak ||  || Bangkok, Thailand || Decision || 5 || 3:00

|-  style="background:#fbb;"
| 1979-05-03 || Loss ||align=left| Dieselnoi Chor Thanasukarn ||  || Bangkok, Thailand || Decision || 5 ||3:00 

|-  style="background:#cfc;"
| 1979-04-03 || Win ||align=left| Khaosod Sitpraprom || Lumpinee Stadium || Bangkok, Thailand || TKO||4 || 

|-  style="background:#cfc;"
| 1979-03-01 || Win ||align=left| Dieselnoi Chor Thanasukarn || Rajadamnern Stadium || Bangkok, Thailand || TKO (Doctor Stoppage)|| 4 ||

|-  style="background:#cfc;"
| 1979-01-17 || Win ||align=left| Narongnoi Kiatbandit|| Rajadamnern Stadium || Bangkok, Thailand || Decision || 5 || 3:00

|-  style="background:#cfc;"
| 1978-12-05 || Win ||align=left| Vicharnnoi Porntawee|| Rajadamnern Stadium || Bangkok, Thailand || Decision || 5 || 3:00

|-  style="background:#cfc;"
| 1978-11-02 || Win ||align=left| Sagat Petchyindee || || Bangkok, Thailand || Decision || 5 || 3:00

|-  style="background:#cfc;"
| 1978-09-28 || Win ||align=left| Nongkhai Sor.Prapatsorn || Rajadamnern Stadium || Bangkok, Thailand || Decision || 5 ||3:00

|-  style="background:#fbb;"
| 1978-08-28 || Loss||align=left| Sagat Petchyindee || Rajadamnern Stadium || Bangkok, Thailand || Decision || 5 || 3:00

|-  style="background:#cfc;"
| 1978-08-03 || Win||align=left| Tawanok Sitpoonchai||Rajadamnern Stadium  || Bangkok, Thailand || Decision || 5 || 3:00

|-  style="background:#fbb;"
| 1978-06-29 || Loss ||align=left| Ruengsak Porntawee ||Rajadamnern Stadium|| Bangkok, Thailand || Decision || 5 || 3:00

|-  style="background:#fbb;"
| 1978-03-29 || Loss||align=left| Tawanok Sitpoonchai|| Rajadamnern Stadium || Bangkok, Thailand || Decision || 5 || 3:00

|-  style="background:#fbb;"
| 1978-02-27 || Loss||align=left| Seksan Sor Theppitak|| Rajadamnern Stadium || Bangkok, Thailand || Decision || 5 || 3:00

|-  style="background:#cfc;"
| 1978-01-16 || Win ||align=left| Fakaew Surakosang|| Rajadamnern Stadium || Bangkok, Thailand || Decision || 5 || 3:00

|-  style="background:#fbb;"
| 1977-11-28|| Loss||align=left| Seksan Sor Theppitak||  || Bangkok, Thailand || Decision || 5 || 3:00

|-  style="background:#fbb;"
| 1977-10-31 || Loss ||align=left| Jocky Sitkanpai ||Lumpinee Stadium|| Bangkok, Thailand || Decision || 5 || 3:00

|-  style="background:#fbb;"
| 1977-09-30 || Loss ||align=left| Jocky Sitkanpai ||Lumpinee Stadium|| Bangkok, Thailand || Decision || 5 || 3:00

|-  style="background:#fbb;"
| 1977-09-06 || Loss ||align=left| Wangwon Lukmatulee  ||Lumpinee Stadium|| Bangkok, Thailand || TKO (Doctor Stoppage)|| 2 || 

|-  style="background:#cfc;"
| 1977-08-04 || Win ||align=left| Samersing Tianhirun || Rajadamnern Stadium || Bangkok, Thailand || Decision || 5 || 3:00

|-  style="background:#cfc;"
| 1977-07-06 || Win ||align=left| Chanchai BuraphaMusic || Rajadamnern Stadium || Bangkok, Thailand || Decision || 5 || 3:00

|-  style="background:#cfc;"
| 1977-06-02 || Win ||align=left| Kengkaj Kiatkriangkrai || Rajadamnern Stadium || Bangkok, Thailand || Decision || 5 || 3:00

|-  style="background:#cfc;"
| 1977-04-28 || Win ||align=left| Nanfah Seeharajdesho ||Rajadamnern Stadium|| Bangkok, Thailand || Decision || 5 || 3:00

|-  style="background:#fbb;"
| 1977-03-31 || Loss||align=left| Kengkaj Kiatkriangkrai || Rajadamnern Stadium || Bangkok, Thailand || Decision || 5 || 3:00

|-  style="background:#cfc;"
| 1977-03-11 || Win ||align=left| Machurat Lukkhaotakep || Rajadamnern Stadium || Bangkok, Thailand || Decision || 5 || 3:00

|-  style="background:#cfc;"
| 1977-02-04 || Win ||align=left| Nanfah Seeharajdesho ||Lumpinee Stadium|| Bangkok, Thailand || Decision || 5 || 3:00

|-  style="background:#cfc;"
| 1976-12-27 || Win ||align=left| Orachunnoi Hor Mahachai || Rajadamnern Stadium || Bangkok, Thailand || Decision || 5 || 3:00
|-
| colspan=9 | Legend:

See more
List of Muay Thai practitioners

References

1957 births
Living people
Padejsuk Pitsanurachan
Padejsuk Pitsanurachan